Helene is a female given name, a variant of Helen, using the French spelling. Helen is ultimately from Greek Ἑλένη.

The name is used in many other languages. Name days: Hungary (as Helén) - October 14, Estonia - August 18, Greece (as Ελένη) - May 21.

People with the given name Helene
Duchess Helene of Mecklenburg-Schwerin (1814–1858), Duchess of Orléans
Princess Hélène of Orléans (1871–1951), Duchess of Aosta, second daughter of Prince Philippe, Count of Paris
Duchess Helene in Bavaria (1834–1890), Hereditary Princess of Thurn and Taxis, 
Duchess Helene of Mecklenburg-Strelitz (1857–1936), great-granddaughter of Paul I of Russia
Helene Liliendahl Brydensholt (born 1987), Danish politician
Hélène Conway-Mouret (born 1960), French politician
Hélène Defrance (born 1986), French sailor
Helene Fesenmaier (1937–2013), American painter and sculptor
Helene Mayer (1910–1953), German and American Olympic champion foil fencer
Hélène Miard-Delacroix (born 1959), French historian, Germanist, professor
Helene Michelson (born 1906, date of death unknown), Estonian figure skater 
Hélène Missoffe (1927–2015), French politician
Hélène Morlon (born 1978), French mathematician and ecologist
Hélène Noesmoen (born 1992), French windsurfer
Hélène Olivier-Bourbigou (born 1962), French chemist and engineer
Hélène Pastor (1937–2014), heiress and businesswoman from Monaco
Hélène Pelletier-Baillargeon (born 1932), Canadian journalist and writer
Helene Schjerfbeck (1862–1946), Finnish artist
Hélène Ségara (born 1971), French singer
Helene Vannari (1948–2022), Estonian actress
Hélène Rollès (born 1966), French singer
Hélène Ryckmans (born 1959), Belgian politician
Helene Tschitschko (1908–1992), Austrian politician

References

Danish feminine given names
English feminine given names
Estonian feminine given names
Finnish feminine given names
French feminine given names
Given names of Greek language origin
Greek feminine given names
Icelandic feminine given names
Norwegian feminine given names
Scandinavian feminine given names
Swedish feminine given names